Mecynostomum is a genus of worms belonging to the family Mecynostomidae.

The species of this genus are found in Europe and Central America.

Species

Species:

Mecynostomum auritum 
Mecynostomum caudatum 
Mecynostomum cordiforme

References

Acoelomorphs